LMA may refer to:

Medicine
 Laryngeal mask airway, a mask used in anaesthesia and emergency medicine

Science
 Laban movement analysis, a language for describing, visualizing, interpreting and documenting human movement
 Land-mammal age
 Leaf mass per area, the inverse of Specific leaf area
 Levenberg–Marquardt algorithm, a mathematical procedure

Organisations
 Ladies' Memorial Association, Southern local organizations dedicated to the Confederate dead
 League Managers Association, an organization representing managers of English football clubs
 Lebanese Muslim Association, Sydney, Australia
 Light Miniature Aircraft, an aircraft design firm based in Okeechobee, Florida, United States
 Ligue de Martinique d'Athlétisme,  the governing body for the sport of athletics in Martinique
 Liverpool Media Academy, a media, music and performing arts college in Liverpool, England
 Loan Market Association, a UK-based organisation formed to support the secondary loan market in Europe
 Lockheed Martin Aerospace, formally Lockheed Martin Corporation, a major US aerospace corporation
 London Metropolitan Archives, the main repository for archives pertaining to Greater London

Places
 Longwood Medical and Academic Area, Boston, United States
 Minchumina Airport, Alaska, United States

Other
 LaMarcus Aldridge (born 1985), American former basketball player
 Late Middle Ages, a period in history
 Live Music Archive, a subsection of the Internet Archive
 Local marketing agreement, an agreement whereby an entity operates a broadcast media outlet licensed to a different owner